Joseph Lamont Mays (born July 6, 1985) is a former American football linebacker. He played college football at North Dakota State and was drafted by the Philadelphia Eagles in the sixth round of the 2008 NFL Draft. Mays also played for the Denver Broncos, Houston Texans, Kansas City Chiefs and San Diego Chargers.

Early years
Mays attended Hyde Park High School in Chicago, Illinois. He did not play football until his junior year of high school. He earned first-team all-conference honors in both his junior and senior years. He was named a first-team all-city selection as a senior in football after he made 115 tackles, 16 sacks, and two interceptions.

College career
As a senior at North Dakota State, Mays led the team on defense with 90 tackles, nine tackles-for-loss and 2.5 sacks. He earned All-American honors and was named the Great West Conference Defensive Player of the Year.

Mays was a three-time first-team All-Great West Conference selection in his career. He made 285 total tackles, a school-record 159 solo tackles, 29.5 tackles-for-loss, three interceptions, and eleven sacks in his 31 games started and 43 games played in his career.

Professional career

Philadelphia Eagles
Mays was drafted by the Philadelphia Eagles in the sixth round with the 200th overall pick of the 2008 NFL Draft. He spent most of the 2008 season inactive, but played in the last two games of the season on special teams.

On August 2, 2009, the starting linebacker for the Eagles, Stewart Bradley, suffered a season-ending torn ACL during training camp.  At subsequent Eagles practices, Mays was promoted to Bradley's position, middle linebacker, although Omar Gaither beat him out for the job.

Denver Broncos

Mays was traded to the Denver Broncos in exchange for running back J. J. Arrington on July 30, 2010.

On September 25, 2012, Mays was suspended for one game and fined $50,000 dollars by the NFL for his hit on the Houston Texans quarterback Matt Schaub that lacerated Schaub's earlobe.  During the Week 8 game against the New Orleans Saints, Mays fractured his fibula and was placed on injured reserve.

On July 23, 2013, Mays was released by the Broncos.

Houston Texans
On July 29, 2013, Mays signed with the Houston Texans to a one-year contract.

Kansas City Chiefs
Mays signed with the Kansas City Chiefs on March 12, 2014. Due to an injury suffered in the Chiefs final preseason game, Mays was placed on injured reserve with a designated for return tag, and was activated on November 8, 2014. He was released by the team on March 5, 2015.

New York Jets
Mays was signed by the New York Jets on April 13, 2015.

San Diego Chargers

Mays signed a 1-year contract with the San Diego Chargers on October 20, 2015.

Personal life
Mays earned a degree in physical education from North Dakota State. He and his wife, LaToyia, have one son, Jai, and one daughter, Joi.

References

External links
Kansas City Chiefs bio

1985 births
Living people
Players of American football from Chicago
American football linebackers
North Dakota State Bison football players
Philadelphia Eagles players
Denver Broncos players
Houston Texans players
Kansas City Chiefs players
New York Jets players
San Diego Chargers players
Hyde Park Academy High School alumni